The Steeplechasing Hall of Fame is a museum at Prestbury Park, in the village of Prestbury, Gloucestershire. Opened in 1994 at Cheltenham Racecourse, the Hall of Fame charts steeplechasing history from 1819 and showcases the sport's riders and trainers associated with National Hunt racing.

Members
Michael W. Dickinson

Dick Francis

References

 The Encyclopedia of British Horseracing by Wray Vamplew, Joyce Kay

Steeplechase (horse racing)
Horse racing in Great Britain
Horse racing museums and halls of fame
Halls of fame in England
Equestrian museums in the United Kingdom
Museums established in 1994
1994 establishments in the United Kingdom